The Sri Jayewardenepura General Hospital (SJGH) is a government owned, not for profit tertiary care institute which was gifted by the people of Japan, honoring the late President His Excellency J.R. Jayawardana. Established under the provision of parliament Act number 54 of 1983 and has been managed by a board of members since its inception on the 17th of September 1984.

It is located in Sri Jayewardenepura, the capital of Sri Lanka, on nearly 30 acres of beautifully landscaped garden with serene nature. This state of the art green conceptual hospital maintains and preserves its environmental policies thoroughly for sustainable development. Eco-friendly hospital environment of SJGH has a nurturing, therapeutic effect and this helps to reduce patients' anxiety and stress, accelerate recovery, shorten hospitalizations, and promote a sense of well-being while uplifting the tranquility of the staff

This multi-specialty tertiary care Centre, offers a comprehensive full spectrum of care for the last 37 years, ranging from minor ailments to complex brain and heart surgeries at a substantially low cost. With over 1000 beds, our in-ward patient care facility is classified into three classes. Class 1 with en-suite room facility with all necessary amenities, class two consist of six bedded cubicles with one shared bathroom while the latter offers spacious non-congested separable beds with clean sanitary facilities. This allows the patient to conveniently choose their stay affordably as billing is itemized unlike in the for profit hospitals.

References 

http://sjgh.health.gov.lk/

Hospitals in Colombo District